Abdulghaphor Hajjieh (born 15 March 1988) is an economist, politician and former student leader. He is a former vice president of the Youth Association of Kuwait, former board secretary of Kuwait Democratic Forum.

Early life and education
Hajjieh was born on March 15, 1988, in Salmiya, the third child of Mohammed Hajjieh Asirri. He attended Khaled Saud Al Zaid High School, where he majored in science. At High School, he volunteered for the Democratic Circle Ticket which ran for student council.

He was accepted in Kuwait University, where he majored in Economics. He explains that his acceptance was based on a Public Authority for Applied Education and Training certificate not his high school diploma, restricting his application to business school, adding that economics was the closest thing to Political Science and that he likes how it draws from other disciplines and the abstract nature of it.

At KU, he joined the Dean's List Council, a prestigious student organization that represents the interests of honor students, and was later elected as its vice president and eventually its president. As President of that organization, he voted on rewriting its bylaws to include direct student academic assistance through one-on-one tutoring and pushed for rebranding the organization and adopting the initials DLCCBA.

He also joined the Democratic Circle, a left-leaning student organization that supports a ticket that runs for the board National Union for Kuwaiti Students, and became its treasurer. During his tenure as treasurer he tapped into a network of former members and organizations such as Kuwait Democratic Forum, National Democratic Alliance and Youth Association of Kuwait to help fund it.

Furthermore, with a group of colleagues, he started KU's first online, streaming through SoundCloud and later YouTube, named the Voice of CBA that had two recurring shows, one commenting on current student affairs and another interviewing student activists about their interests. However, after one month he was instructed to shut it down due to complaints of bias.

During his time at Kuwait University, he worked at Al Qabas Newspaper and Al Taleea Newspaper as a journalist, and before graduation he was chosen to intern at the United States Department of State. He graduated summa cum laude.

Through a scholarship from Kuwait Institute for Scientific Research, he is currently doing a graduate degree in economics at the University of Kansas, where he was chosen to lead the prestigious Economics Graduate Student Organization.

He also supports Al Wihda, a liberal student organization that runs for the National Union of Kuwaiti Students's USA branch seats, writing in Al Anba newspaper that it's a principled organization that believes in democracy, liberty, equality and justice, furthermore explaining that any Kuwaiti student in the United States that's against sectarianism and tribalism should support it.

Career 
Hajjieh has a diverse experience, working in various organizations in different capacities.

Hajjieh joined the International Monetary Fund after graduating from Kuwait University as a Research Assistant and Course Administrator at their region office in Kuwait, the IMF's Center for Economics and Finance.

Working at the IMF, he gained extensive knowledge on how international organizations operate and communicate with governments, learning diplomatic language and protocol on the hands of various senior IMF officials, and interacting on a regular basis with Arab government officials when organizing economic training courses in monetary policy, fiscal policy, energy policy, financial programming and other topics.

He also helped organize a symposium which celebrated American journalist Thomas Friedman spoke in, and a high level economic crash course for newly elected parliamentarians in the middle east.

Hajjieh moved to the private sector to work as an Investor Relations Manager at Safat Investment Company, a medium-sized investment conglomerate. He also spearheaded different projects which one of yielded a Guinness World Record for the world's largest building sticket.

After a short stint in the private sector, he was recruited to join the Techno-Economic Division at Kuwait Institute for Scientific Research, working on policy papers and empirical economic research on trade, investment and economic policy.

Community Participation and Activism
Abdulghaphor Hajjieh joined multiple liberal and left-leaning organizations in Kuwait in addition to Kuwait Graduate Society and Kuwait Economic Society.

Abdulghaphor was recruited by Ali Hussain Al-Awadhi to join the Democratic Forum after representing the Youth Association of Kuwait in multiple events. In 2019, he was elected as a board member for the Forum and was later re-elected to the board and promoted to board secretary in 2020 where he served until 2022.

He was a fixture of the Forum's electoral campaigns, working for Mohammed Al-Abduljader's in 2008, Abdullah Al-Naibari in 2009, Mohammed Al-Abduljader in 2012 and 2013.

Hajjieh joined the National Democratic Youth Association in 2007, which later became the Youth Association of Kuwait in 2010, an affiliate of the Democratic Forum. He represented the Association at Kuwait Civil Alliance in 2014, and helped issue a Universal Periodic Review document that was discussed at the United Nations Human Rights Council.

Also, in 2014 he spearheaded a campaign that successfully lobbied the Kuwaiti Ministry of Youth Affairs and the Ministry of Social Works to issue a regulatory framework that gives volunteer organizations legal status. In 2015, the Association was granted legal status under Kuwaiti law and he was elected as treasurer of the newly formed legal entity. In 2017 he was elected to Vice President of the Youth Association of Kuwait, however he quit soon after to pursue a political career in the Democratic Forum of Kuwait.

Abdulghaphor was requested by a senior government official in 2019 to participate in the Amiri Diwan's National Youth Project as quasi-representative of young leftists, where he participated in discussions that culminated in issuing the Youth Policy Manual. He also participated in the Diwan's Kuwait Nudgeathon competition of which he won.

Views 
As an economist, Hajjieh writes generally about topics ranging from technology to public policy in various publications, mainly Al Qabas and Al Anbaa Newspapers.

Automation 
Abdulghaphor views automation as an inevitable outcome of technological progress, analyzing that the steady rise of unemployment in the middle east is partly caused by the modernization of both the private and public sector. He adds that governments across the middle east should rethink their education policies to include transferrable skills that can adjust to increasing deindustrialization of multiple sectors. He professes that the world is going to split not between core states and peripheral states, but between countries that invest heavy in science and technology and those that don't.

References 

1988 births
Living people
Kuwaiti politicians
Kuwaiti economists
Kuwaiti people of Iranian descent
Kuwait University alumni